The 1988 United States presidential election in Arizona  took place on November 8, 1988. All fifty states and the District of Columbia, were part of the 1988 United States presidential election. State voters chose seven electors to the Electoral College, which selected the president and vice president.

Arizona was won by incumbent United States Vice President George H. W. Bush of Texas, who was running against Massachusetts Governor Michael Dukakis. Bush ran with Indiana Senator Dan Quayle as Vice President, and Dukakis ran with Texas Senator Lloyd Bentsen.

Arizona weighed in for this election as 14 points more Republican than the national average. The presidential election of 1988 was a very partisan election for Arizona, with nearly 99% of the electorate voting for either the Democratic or Republican parties. Nearly every county turned out for Bush, with the exception of Native American Apache County and heavily unionized Greenlee County voting primarily for Dukakis.

, this is the last occasion when the counties of Coconino, Pima and Santa Cruz have voted for the Republican presidential candidate.

Republican victory
Bush won the election in the traditionally conservative and Republican state of Arizona with a solid 21-point margin. The election results in Arizona are reflective of a nationwide political reconsolidation of base for the Republican Party, which took place through the 1980s. Through the passage of some very controversial economic programs, spearheaded by then President Ronald Reagan (called, collectively, "Reaganomics"), the mid-to-late 1980s saw a period of economic growth and stability. The hallmark for Reaganomics was, in part, the wide-scale deregulation of corporate interests, and tax cuts for the wealthy.

Dukakis ran on a notably socially liberal platform, and advocated for higher economic regulation and environmental protection. Bush, alternatively, ran on a campaign of continuing the social and economic policies of former President Reagan which gained him much support with social conservatives and people living in rural areas. Additionally, while the economic programs passed under Reagan, and furthered under Bush and Clinton, may have boosted the economy for a brief period, they are criticized by many analysts as "setting the stage" for economic troubles in the United States after 2007, such as the Great Recession.

Results

Results by county

See also
 Presidency of George H. W. Bush

References

Arizona
1988
1988 Arizona elections